Ives Tongue is a narrow tongue of land projecting from an island between Fold Island and the coast of Kemp Land, Antarctica. It was discovered and named in February 1936 by a Discovery Investigations expedition on the RRS William Scoresby.

See also
Mount Whiteside

References

Headlands of Kemp Land